The call center industry in Bangladesh was worth around $12 million in 2013, of which 50 percent was accounted for by the country's domestic market. In 2013, national mobile operators Airtel and Citycell outsourced their call centers to local companies. Bangladesh Telecommunication Regulatory Commission (BTRC) eased the licensing process for call centers in 2013.

A call center "village" was planned in 2009. , around 70 call centers were in operation in Bangladesh. Bangladesh exports its call center services to countries including the United States, Canada and the United Kingdom. The Bangladesh Association of Call Center & Outsourcing (BACCO) was formed in connection with the industry.

References 

Telephony
Industry in Bangladesh
Outsourcing
E-commerce in Bangladesh
Call center industry by country